Phytocoris antennalis is a species in the family Miridae ("plant bugs"), in the order Hemiptera ("true bugs, cicadas, hoppers, aphids and allies").
It is found in North America.

References

Further reading
 Henry, Thomas J., and Richard C. Froeschner, eds. (1988). Catalog of the Heteroptera, or True Bugs, of Canada and the Continental United States, xix + 958.
 
 Thomas J. Henry, Richard C. Froeschner. (1988). Catalog of the Heteroptera, True Bugs of Canada and the Continental United States. Brill Academic Publishers.

Insects described in 1909
Phytocoris